Zbigniew of Brzezie (or Zbigniew Lanckoroński) (ca. 1360 – ca. 1425) was a notable Polish knight and nobleman of Clan Zadora.

Zbigniew served as Marshal of the Crown from 1399 to 1425 and starost of Kraków from 1409 to 1410. He was a diplomat and a close co-worker of King Władysław II Jagiełło. He was several times an envoy to King of Hungary and Germany Sigismund of Luxembourg. During the Battle of Grunwald in 1410 he commanded the banner of the Marshal of the Crown.

References

General references
 
 

Lanckoroński family
People in the Battle of Grunwald
14th-century Polish nobility
1360 births
1425 deaths
15th-century Polish nobility